Epectaptera discalis is a moth of the subfamily Arctiinae. It was described by Schaus in 1905. It is found in Peru.

References

 Natural History Museum Lepidoptera generic names catalog

Arctiinae
Moths described in 1905